NGC 3738 is a dwarf galaxy in the constellation of Ursa Major and belongs to the M81 Group of galaxies. NGC  3738 is 12 million light-years from the Sun. The galaxy was first discovered by astronomer William Herschel in 1789. NGC 3738 is a blue compact dwarf, which is small compared to large spiral galaxies. The galaxy is about 10,000 light-years across. It is one-tenth the size of the Milky Way

Blue compact dwarf galaxies are blue in appearance because of the large cluster of hot massive stars. The galaxies are relatively dim and appear to be irregular in shape. They are typically chaotic in appearance.

References

External links 
 

Dwarf galaxies
Ursa Major (constellation)
3738
35856
06565
234